The Dixiachanghe Underground River is a grade AAA tourist attraction in Lanxi, Zhejiang, China. It is known by the local people as Liudong Shan. It is in Liudong Mountain Scenic Area.

Transit 
There are three ways to access this attraction. They are by Long Distance Bus, Regular buses, and by car.

Long Distance Bus 
There are long distance buses departing from Dixiachanghe to Shanghai, Suzhou, Hanzhou, Ningbo, and other cities. The bus to Hangzhou departs eight times every day.

Bus 
The Lanxi Route 301 buses' terminal is Dixiachanghe. It departs every 20–30 minutes. The first bus operates at 5:50 and the last bus operates at 17:30.

Roads 
The Dixiachanghe Underground River is accessible by several roads.

Scenic Area 
The Dixiachanghe is a cave located in Liudong Mountain Scenic Area. As its name suggests, there is a river in the cave.

Entrance 
To enter the cave visitors ride a boat that an employee steers. The visitors wait for the boat at a building located in the front of the mountain.

Rocks of Strange Shapes 
The stones inside the cave sometimes have interesting shapes, such as Snow Piled Up.

Illumination 
These stones are lit up by lights with different colors.

External links 
 http://www.lxlds.cn/ Dixiachanghe Official Site (Chinese)

References 

Rivers of China
Zhejiang